The Last Kids on Earth is a children's animation streaming television series, based on the book series of the same name by Max Brallier, that premiered on Netflix on September 17, 2019 with a one-hour first season. A ten-episode second season, or "Book 2", titled The Last Kids on Earth and the Zombie Parade, premiered on April 17, 2020. The third season also known as "Book 3", was released on October 16, 2020. An interactive special, subtitled Happy Apocalypse to You, was released on April 6, 2021.

Voice cast and characters

 Nick Wolfhard as Jack Sullivan, a 13-year-old orphan and gamer turned hero thanks to the apocalypse.
 Charles Demers as Dirk Savage, a former school bully turned strongman and monster fighter on Jack's team. He likes cooking and gardening. 
 Montserrat Hernandez as June Del Toro, a tomboyish 13-year-old girl who is Jack's crush but did not reciprocate his feelings, but starts to develop some in Book 2. She was trying to survive on her own until her parents come back for her with a rescue party; but she joins Jack's team and learns to have fun during the apocalypse. She was editor-in-chief of the school's paper.
 Garland Whitt as Quint Baker, Jack's nerdy best friend who invents most of the gadgets the kids use to survive in their post-apocalyptic environment.
 Brian Drummond as the vocal effects for Rover, a blue-furred canine-like monster who befriends Jack in Book 1 and becomes the team's pet and mascot.
 Mark Hamill as Bardle, a gruff monster conjurer that takes up residence in Joe's Pizza who, like June, has been investigating the most recent phenomena and paranormal events.
 Catherine O'Hara as Skaelka, a female monster warrior that takes up residence in Joe's Pizza and becomes a friend of June's.
 Keith David as Thrull, the main antagonist in Book 2 who poses as the kids' friend at first before betraying them and his fellow monsters in Book 2, episode 8. He dies in Book 2, episode 10 "Dawn of Rezzoch".
 Bruce Campbell as Chef, a cranky Squid monster that takes up residence in Joe's Pizza.
 Rosario Dawson as Rezzoch, the main antagonist of the series as revealed in Book 2, episode 2; has her first lines and first full appearance in Book 2, episode 8 before becoming a series regular as of the 9th and Book 2 finale episodes.

Episodes

Series overview

Book 1 (2019) The Pilot [unofficial]

Book 2 (2020) TV [official]

Book 3 (2020)

Special (2021)

Production
On September 26, 2017, it was announced that Thunderbird Entertainment's animation studio Atomic Cartoons had optioned the screen rights on Max Brallier's book series The Last Kids on Earth with the intention of producing an animated television series.

On February 26, 2018, it was announced that Netflix had given the production a series order. Executive producers include Brallier, Scott Peterson, Jennifer McCarron, and Matthew Berkowitz. Brallier and Peterson are also expected to write the series as well. Production companies involved in the series include Thunderbird Entertainment's animation studio Atomic Cartoons.

On March 13, 2019, the series cast was announced, including Mark Hamill, Rosario Dawson, Catherine O'Hara, Keith David, Bruce Campbell, Garland Whitt, Montserrat Hernandez, Charles Demers, and Nick Wolfhard as the lead character Jack Sullivan.

It was initially reported that the series would be released on May 30, 2019, but it instead premiered on September 17, 2019.

A screenshot of a message by Max Brallier reveals that the show was cancelled during the pandemic, but he is currently working on a live action version.

Merchandise
Jakks Pacific launched a toyline based on the series in early 2020. Outright Games will publish a video game tie-in The Last Kids on Earth and the Staff of Doom, for across consoles and PC in 2021. A graphic novel, subtitled Thrilling Tales from the Tree House, is currently released as of April 6, 2021.

Reception 

The series received a mixed reception. Ashley Moulton of Common Sense Media reviewed the interactive special, "The Last Kids on Earth: Happy Apocalypse to You," describing it a "fun interactive episode" with scary scenes and cartoon violence. She stated that because of the special's format, some elements from the original series is lacking, but that the special is "very fun nonetheless."

Awards

Notes

References

External links

2010s American animated television series
2020s American animated television series
2019 American television series debuts
2010s Canadian animated television series
2020s Canadian animated television series
2019 Canadian television series debuts
American children's animated adventure television series
American television shows based on children's books
Canadian children's animated adventure television series
Canadian television shows based on children's books
Netflix children's programming
Animated television series by Netflix
English-language Netflix original programming
Animated television series about orphans
Zombies in television